The men's team foil competition at the 2018 Asian Games in Jakarta was held on 24 August at the Jakarta Convention Center. China leads with five gold medals in this event, while South Korea and Japan were in the second and third position with 3 and 2 gold medals respectively. The other countries that ever won medals in this event were Hong Kong with 4 bronzes and Iran with a bronze.

South Korean team emerged as the champion in the men's team foil event for the third times after the victorious in 1986 Seoul and 1994 Hiroshima. The team defeated the top seeded Hong Kong with the score 45–37 in the final. Hong Kong team settled for the silver medal, while China and Japan teams who were beaten in the semifinals clinched the bronze medal.

Schedule
All times are Western Indonesia Time (UTC+07:00)

Seeding
The teams were seeded taking into account the results achieved by competitors representing each team in the individual event.

Results

Final standing

References

Results

External links
 Fencing at the 2018 Asian Games - Men's team foil

Men's foil team